Pando may refer to:

People 
 Pando of Capua (died 862 or 863), "Pando the Rapacious", Count of Capua
 Gabriela Pando (born 1970), Argentine field hockey player
 José Manuel Pando (1849–1917), 29th President of Bolivia
 Juan Pando (born 1943), Spanish historian
 Ricardo Pando, Peruvian Congressman for the 2006–2011 term
 Pando, bass player for A Flock of Seagulls

Places 
 José Manuel Pando Province, a province of La Paz Department, Bolivia
 Pando Department, Bolivia
 Pando, Colorado, a ghost town in the United States
 Pando, Uruguay, a town in Canelones, Uruguay
 Pando Creek, a body of water in Canelones, Uruguay

Other uses 
 Apostolic Vicariate of Pando, of the Roman Catholic church, located in Riberalta, Bolivia
 Pando (application), a proprietary peer-to-peer file-sharing computer program, based on the BitTorrent protocol
 Pando Health an app used in the British NHS
 Pando (tree), an aspen tree colony in Utah which is several thousand years old
 Pando (news site), an online Silicon Valley news site
 Taking of Pando, the occupation of the Uruguayan city of Pando by the Tupamaros in 1969

See also 
 Panda (disambiguation)
 Pandoc, a free-software document converter
 Ponda (disambiguation)